The Furqan Force or Furqan Battalion was a uniformed Battalion force of volunteers of the minority Ahmadiyya Muslim Community in the Dominion of Pakistan. Formed in June 1948 at the direction of Head of the Worldwide Ahmadiyya Muslim Community, Mirza Basheer-ud-Din Mahmood Ahmad, at the request of Pakistan government, the unit fought for Pakistan against India in the First Kashmir War. In addition to its troops being drawn from the Ahmadiyya population, the expenses of maintaining the unit were also paid by that community.

The unit was disbanded on 7 June 1950. Following the anti-Ahmadiyya Lahore riots of 1953, a Pakistani court of inquiry cited the Furqan Battalion in discussions of the Ahmadi role in Pakistani society.

References 

Ahmadiyya in Pakistan
Religious paramilitary organizations
Indo-Pakistani War of 1947–1948
1950 disestablishments in Pakistan